Historic Lincoln County was a county located in the state of Minnesota.  It was located on the north-eastern area of Renville County. The old county was created when it was split off from Renville County in 1861.  It was disbanded in 1868, and merged back into Renville County.

Contemporary Lincoln County, located on the Minnesota-South Dakota border and established on established March 6, 1873, now bears this name.

Lincoln